Dominicomyia is a genus of flies in the family Dolichopodidae from the Neotropical realm.

Species 
 Dominicomyia brasiliensis Robinson, 1977 – Brazil
 Dominicomyia chrysotimoides Robinson, 1975 – Dominica

References 

Dolichopodidae genera
Medeterinae
Diptera of North America
Diptera of South America
Taxa named by Harold E. Robinson